The Royal Logistic Corps Museum is based at Worthy Down near Winchester.   It tells story of logistic support to the British Army from Agincourt to the modern day.   The museum holds the collection of the Royal Logistic Corps RLC and the collections of its forming corps, including the Royal Corps of Transport, the Royal Army Ordnance Corps, Royal Pioneer Corps, Army Catering Corps and the Postal and Courier Section of the Royal Engineers.

History
The museum collection includes objects and archives from the RLC since its formation and the collections from the museums of the Royal Corps of Transport and of the Royal Army Ordnance Corps along with objects and archives from the Royal Pioneer Corps and Army Catering Corps.  The RLC Museum was first established in Princess Royal Barracks Deepcut in 1995, but moved to Worthy Down in 2021.  After an extensive refit and redesign, the new RLC Museum now has over 50 display cases and has many more objects on display than before.

Collections
Exhibits include the Rolls-Royce that Field Marshal Montgomery was driven in when he landed in France shortly after D-Day, Napoleon’s field bakery captured at the Battle of Waterloo, a large collection of horse-drawn and motorised military logistics vehicles, bomb disposal vehicles and equipment, weapons and an extensive world-class medal collection, which features several Victoria Crosses and medals won at the Battle of Waterloo.

The new state-of-the-art museum offers visitors an insight into how the British Army was moved, supplied and sustained over the centuries.

References

External links
Royal Logistic Corps Museum
The RLC On-Line Archive
 

Regimental museums in England
Museums in Hampshire
Royal Logistic Corps